Clyde Huntley Burroughs (February 17, 1882 – October 5, 1973) was a museum director from Vassar, Michigan.

Biography 
He began work at the Detroit Museum of Art (predecessor to the Detroit Institute of Arts) in 1901 as assistant to museum director Armand H. Griffith and was officially conferred in 1904. Clyde Burroughs became acting director of the museum in 1913 and then assistant director to Charles Moore (city planner) from 1914 to 1917. He was director in his own right between 1917 and 1924. In 1924, Wilhelm Valentiner became director and Clyde Burroughs stayed at the museum as secretary and curator of American Art. He was also a charter member of the Scarab Club. He was chairman of the district committee for public works from 1933 to 1934, helping to find work for artists during the depression. He stayed on at the Detroit Institute of Arts as secretary until his retirement in 1946.

Eventually, he and his wife Edith settled in San Diego, California.

He passed away in San Diego, California in 1973 at the age of 91.

Selected works
Burroughs as author or co-author:
  (with Wilhelm Valentiner)
  (with Wiliam Heil)

See also
 Detroit Institute of Arts
 Scarab Club
 Wilhelm Reinhold Valentiner
 Charles Moore (city planner)

References

External links
A portrait of Clyde Burroughs by John Stephens Coppin, held by the Detroit Institute of Arts.
List of records kept in Detroit Institute of Arts library.
Interview held by The American Art Archives, Oral history interview conducted by E.P. Richardson in 1956.
Interview held by The American Art Archives, Oral history interview conducted by William E. Woolfenden in 1961.

Detroit Institute of Arts
People associated with the Detroit Institute of Arts
Directors of museums in the United States
1882 births
1973 deaths